Gaab may refer to:

People 
 Ahmed Mohamed Ahmed (Gaab), Swiss-Somali footballer
 Johann Friedrich Gaab, German theologian
 Michael R. Gaab, German neurological surgeon

Other uses 
 gaab, alternative word for Syahi, a musical tuning paste
 GAAB, acronym for Georgia and Alabama Railroad

See also 
Gaabu
GAA Beo